Expediente Negro (Spanish for "Black Dossier") is a non-fiction 1972 book written by José Vicente Rangel about the murders in the 1960s of Venezuelan campesinos (farmers).

 José Vicente Rangel (1972), Expediente Negro, Caracas: Editorial Fuentes

1972 non-fiction books
Human rights abuses in Venezuela
1960s in Venezuela